The Karen National Party (KNP) is a political party in Myanmar (Burma). The party was registered on 24 October 2014. Despite being based in Yangon, the party only contested constituencies in Kayin State (Karen State) in the 2015 general election. After the government relaxed naming rules in 2012, the party changed its name from the then government approved "Kayin" National Party to the Karen National Party.

References

Political parties in Myanmar
Political parties established in 2014
2014 establishments in Myanmar